Sir Walter Henry Wilkin, KCMG, VD, JP, DL (1 April 1842 – 13 November 1922) was a British barrister and businessman who was Lord Mayor of London for 1895–96.

Life 
The son of David Wilkin, of Kelvedon Hatch, Essex, and of the City of London, Walker Wilkin born in the city and educated at Dr Pinches' school in Lombard Street, where he was a fellow pupil of Sir Edward Clarke and Sir Henry Irving. He initially joined a firm of underwriters at Lloyd's, but left to be called to the Bar by the Middle Temple in 1875. He was prevented from entering practise by the death of his father and elder brother, which led him to inheriting the family's yeast importing business.

Wilkin was successively Master of the Barbers’, Broderers’ and Coachmakers’ Companies. He became Common Councillor for Lime Street in 1876 and held the post until 1888, when he became an Alderman. He was Sheriff of London in 1892–93, and Lord Mayor of London for 1895–96.

He was a member of the Thames Conservancy Board between 1898 and 1909, as well as Colonel of the 3rd Middlesex Artillery Volunteers.

He was knighted in 1893, and appointed KCMG in 1896.

Family 
Wilkin married in 1872 Margot Dale, daughter of Henry Ridley Dale. They had two sons and one daughter.

References

External links

 https://www.ukwhoswho.com/view/10.1093/ww/9780199540891.001.0001/ww-9780199540884-e-204673

1842 births
1922 deaths
People from the City of London
Knights Bachelor
Members of the Middle Temple
British businesspeople
Councilmen of the City of London
Aldermen of the City of London
Sheriffs of the City of London
19th-century lord mayors of London
Knights Commander of the Order of St Michael and St George
English justices of the peace
Deputy Lieutenants